Harry McDonald (11 September 1926 – 2004) was an English, retired professional footballer who played in the Football League for Crystal Palace as a defender. He also played non-league football for Ashton United, Kettering Town and Gravesend and Northfleet.

Playing career
McDonald began his playing career with Ashton United, for whom he made 104 appearances, scoring once and did not enter the professional game until the relatively late age of 24. He was signed for Crystal Palace in September 1950, by then manager, Ronnie Rooke. and made his debut in a 5–0 away defeat to Bournemouth on 14 October. McDonald made only 12 appearances that season, but over the subsequent four Division Three South seasons, became a regular in the side making a total of 146 appearances, scoring one goal against Northampton Town in September 1954.

At the end of that season McDonald moved back into non-league football with Kettering Town and subsequently played for Gravesend and Northfleet. At Gravesend, McDonald made a total of 324 appearances and helped the club win the Southern League title.

McDonald died in 2004, aged 77 or 78.

References

External links

Harry McDonald at holmesdale.net

1926 births
2004 deaths
Footballers from Salford
English footballers
Association football defenders
English Football League players
Southern Football League players
Ashton United F.C. players
Crystal Palace F.C. players
Kettering Town F.C. players
Ebbsfleet United F.C. players